The Lashes were a Seattle-based power pop band that formed in 2000 and became inactive in 2008.

In 2004, the Lashes released the Stupid Stupid EP, produced by John Goodmanson, on Lookout! Records.  Goodmanson also produced their debut album, Get It, released by Columbia Records in 2006. 

On May 5, 2007, Lashes guitarist Eric Howk fell into a  hole at a construction site near a friend's house and broke several vertebrae and severed his spine.  The accident left him paralyzed from the waist down. On May 17, 2007, the McLeod Residence hosted a benefit for Howk. Donations collected at the event raised money to help cover his medical bills.

The band continued to perform and played at Bumbershoot 2007 that September.

The band self-released Thank You Side A on January 1, 2008.  It was released exclusively at Sonic Boom Records and produced by John Goodmanson.

Discography
The Stupid Stupid (EP) (Lookout! Records, 2004)
Get It (Columbia Records, 2006)
Thank You Side A (EP) 2008

References

External links
 The Lashes Official Website

American power pop groups